Liptena priscilla, the Obudu liptena, is a butterfly in the family Lycaenidae. It is found in Nigeria (the Obudu Plateau). The habitat consists of submontane forests.

References

Butterflies described in 1995
Liptena
Endemic fauna of Nigeria
Butterflies of Africa